Madan-e Sangrud (also Romanized as Maʿdan-e Sangrūd; also known as Sangarud and Sangrūd) is a village in Jirandeh Rural District, Amarlu District, Rudbar County, Gilan Province, Iran. At the 2006 census, its population was 352, in 92 families.

References 

Populated places in Rudbar County